Ernesto Garrido is a paralympic swimmer from Cuba competing mainly in category S10 events.

Ernesto competed in three paralympics, in his first games in 1992 though he was entered in the athletics shot put and discus he didn't compete in them and instead competed in the pool. He competed in the 100m freestyle, winning his heat but only managing fourth in the final, the 50m freestyle where he again won his heat but was beaten in the final by Italian Gianluca Saini who set a new world record, the 200m medley finishing last in the final and the 400m freestyle where despite setting a world record in the heat and swimming faster in the final still ended up fourth.

References

External links
 

Paralympic swimmers of Cuba
Swimmers at the 1992 Summer Paralympics
Swimmers at the 1996 Summer Paralympics
Swimmers at the 2000 Summer Paralympics
Paralympic silver medalists for Cuba
Cuban male freestyle swimmers
Living people
Medalists at the 1992 Summer Paralympics
Year of birth missing (living people)
Paralympic medalists in swimming
S10-classified Paralympic swimmers